Indolestes boninensis is a species of damselfly in the family Lestidae. It is endemic to Japan.

References

Lestidae
Odonata of Asia
Insects of Japan
Critically endangered insects
Critically endangered biota of Asia
Insects described in 1952
Taxonomy articles created by Polbot